Arey Island is a 7-mile-long (11 km) barrier island on the North Slope of the U.S. state of Alaska. It is located west of Barter Island, between Arey Lagoon and the Beaufort Sea.
In the past, visitors and guides have used Arey Island as a departure point from the coastal plain. Though this may still be possible, most of Arey Island is private land, so permission for its use must be obtained from, and the access fees paid to, the Kaktovik Inupiat Corporation (KIC). Without this permission, public access to Arey Island is limited.

External links
Trek across Brooks Range to the Arctic Ocean - via Arey Island

Islands of Alaska
Islands of the Beaufort Sea
Islands of North Slope Borough, Alaska
Barrier islands of the United States